Ludovic Mathieu (born 25 September 1976) is a French short track speed skater. He competed at the 1998 Winter Olympics and the 2002 Winter Olympics.

References

External links
 

1976 births
Living people
French male short track speed skaters
Olympic short track speed skaters of France
Short track speed skaters at the 1998 Winter Olympics
Short track speed skaters at the 2002 Winter Olympics
People from Thionville
Sportspeople from Moselle (department)
21st-century French people